Coleophora cretaticostella is a moth of the family Coleophoridae. It is found in North America, including Ohio, Pennsylvania and Ontario.

The wingspan is about 11 mm.

The larvae feed on the buds of Rubus species. They create a composite leaf case.

References

cretaticostella
Moths described in 1860
Moths of North America